The Charge of the Gauchos (Argentine title: Una nueva y gloriosa nación) is a 1928 American-Argentine silent historical film directed by Albert H. Kelley and starring Francis X. Bushman, Jacqueline Logan and Guido Trento. Bushman plays Manuel Belgrano, one of the leaders of the 1810 May Revolution. The film's Spanish title refers to a line from the Argentine national anthem. It was made as a patriotic endeavor designed to boost the small Argentine film industry, but with enough action and romance to appeal to international audiences particularly in the UK and the United States. The film is also titled The Beautiful Spy.

Plot
General Manuel Belgrano (Bushman) is leading a military campaign against Spanish rule. His sweetheart, Monica (Logan), the daughter of a Spanish loyalist, is acting as a spy and supplying information. Monica is captured and sentenced to be executed. Belgrano has to rally his supporters to free her.

Cast
 Francis X. Bushman as Manuel Belgrano
 Jacqueline Logan as Monica Salazar 
 Guido Trento as Monteros 
 Paul Ellis as Balcarce
 Henry Kolker as Viceroy Cisneros
 Charles Hill Mailes as Saavedra
 Jack Hopkins as Lezica  
 Charles K. French as Salazar 
 Olive Hasbrouck as Mariana 
 Mathilde Comont as Aunt Rosita  
 Jack Ponder as George Gordon  
 Lige Conley as Gómez  
 Gino Corrado as Moreno
 Frank Hagney as Goyeneche
 Otto Hoffman as Balcarce's Father  
 Margaret McWade as Balcarce's Mother  
 James Gordon as Bishop  
 Serge Tatarski as Castelli
 Henry Hebert as Martin Rodriguez
 Harry Semels as Beruti
 Elmer Dewey as French
 Curt Furburg as  Patriot

Production

The Spanish-born Argentine producer Julián Ajuria was unhappy with previous representations of Argentina in Hollywood films. After failing to secure Hollywood backing for his project, he raised the finances elsewhere but decided to shoot in North America with a largely American cast in order to boost the film's chances of a good release there. Bushman had been a major star during the silent era, although his career was starting to decline.

Ajuria went to great lengths to recreate authentic costumes and settings of the period. During its production, the film was criticized by Argentine newspapers who felt that it would be another Hollywood-style retelling of Argentina's history, but these attitudes began to change once preview screenings were held.

Release
The film premiered on March 10, 1928 at the Cervantes Theatre in Buenos Aires. It went on release in the United States in September the same year, distributed by FBO which shortly afterwards merged into the major RKO Pictures. The running time of the film was significantly cut down, and it was generally shown as part of a double bill. It was not successful, partly due to the arrival of sound which made silent films noncommercial. However, in Argentina it was exceptionally popular, and remained in release for two whole years. It was the most popular silent film ever released in the country. Ajuria's hope that it would stimulate the creation of an Argentinian film industry, but this not immediately happen.

It was for many years considered a lost film, until its rediscovery and screening in 2013.

References

Bibliography 
 Finkielman, Jorge. The Film Industry in Argentina: An Illustrated Cultural History. McFarland, 2003.

External links 
 

1928 films
1920s historical drama films
American historical drama films
American silent feature films
1920s Spanish-language films
Argentine historical drama films
Argentine silent feature films
Films directed by Albert H. Kelley
Films set in Argentina
Films set in the 1810s
RKO Pictures films
Film Booking Offices of America films
American black-and-white films
1920s rediscovered films
Rediscovered American films
Rediscovered Argentine films
1920s English-language films
1920s multilingual films
American multilingual films
Argentine multilingual films
1920s American films
Silent American drama films